The Fine Gael leadership election of March 1987 was held to find a successor to Garret FitzGerald who resigned following the party's defeat in that year's general election.

It was the first time that a formal election by the parliamentary party had taken place, previous leaders having emerged through a consultation process and were then elected unopposed.  This procedure was not used in 1987 as a number of eligible candidates emerged.

Three candidates immediately emerged for the party leadership – Alan Dukes, former Minister for Justice; John Bruton, former Minister for Finance and the Public Service; and Michael Noonan, former Minister for Industry and Commerce.  An early unofficial ranking of candidates had put Dukes slightly ahead with Noonan trailing in a distant third.  Peter Barry, the deputy leader of the party, refused to announce his candidacy immediately, however, he eventually entered the leadership race as Michael Noonan refused to go stand due to a lack of support.

82 TDs, Senators and MEPs from the Fine Gael parliamentary party were entitled to cast their vote.  The rules in place required the victor to reach 42 votes (half the total vote plus one).  The results were not made public after the election.

On 21 March Alan Dukes was elected leader of Fine Gael by a significant majority.  John Bruton, who would eventually success Dukes as leader, was said to have come second with Peter Barry trailing in third.

References

1987 elections in the Republic of Ireland
History of Fine Gael
Fine Gael leadership elections
Indirect elections
Fine Gael leadership election